The Titanomachy (Greek: Τιτανομαχία) is a lost epic poem, which is a part of Greek mythology. It deals with the struggle that Zeus and his siblings, the Olympian Gods, had in overthrowing their father Cronus and his divine generation, the Titans.

The poem was traditionally ascribed to Eumelus of Corinth (8th century BC), a semi-legendary bard of the Bacchiad ruling family in archaic Corinth, who was treasured as the traditional composer of the Prosodion, the processional  anthem of Messenian independence that was performed on Delos. 

Even in Antiquity many authors cited Titanomachia without an author's name. M. L. West in analyzing the evidence concludes that the name of Eumelos was attached to the poem as the only name available. From the very patchy evidence, it seems that "Eumelos"' account of the Titanomachy differed from the surviving account of Hesiod's Theogony at salient points. The 8th century BC date for the poem is not possible; West ascribes a late seventh-century date as the earliest.

The Titanomachy was divided into at least two books. The battle of Olympians and Titans was preceded by some sort of theogony, or genealogy of the primal gods, in which, the Byzantine writer Lydus remarked, the author of Titanomachy placed the birth of Zeus, not in Crete, but in Lydia, which should signify on Mount Sipylus.

References

External links
Eight surviving fragments

7th-century BC books
Ancient Greek epic poems
Lost poems
References on Greek mythology